The 1995–96 Slovenian Third League was the fourth season of the Slovenian Third League, the third highest level in the Slovenian football system.
Slovan merged with Slavija Vevče after the season.
Jadran Hrpelje-Kozina defeated Pohorje in a promotion play-offs (2:1, 3:2).

League standings

East

West

See also
1995–96 Slovenian Second League

References

External links
Football Association of Slovenia 

Slovenian Third League seasons
3
Slovenia